San Salvador del Valledor is a parish (administrative division) in Allande, a municipality within the province and autonomous community of Asturias, in northern Spain. 

The postal code is 33887.

Villages and hamlets
 As Grobas
 Barras
 Bustarel
 Collada
 Fonteta
 San Salvador
 Trabaces
 Villalaín (Vilalaín)
 Villanueva (Vilanova)

References

External links
 Allande 

Parishes in Allande